Vesta is an unincorporated community in Grays Harbor County, in the U.S. state of Washington.

History
A post office called Vesta was established in 1892, and remained in operation until 1936. The community was named after Vesta Dwinelle, the wife of a local pioneer.

References

Unincorporated communities in Grays Harbor County, Washington
Unincorporated communities in Washington (state)